King in Limbo, known in Japan as Limbo the King, is a Japanese manga series written and illustrated by Ai Tanaka. It was first serialized in Kodansha's josei manga magazine Itan from June 2016 to June 2018, and Comic Days app from August 2018 to August 2019; its chapters were collected in six tankōbon volumes.

Publication
It was later serialized on Kodansha's online platform Comic Days from August 7, 2018, to August 9, 2019. Kodansha collected its chapters in six tankōbon volumes, released from March 1, 2018, to September 20, 2019.

In North America, the manga has been licensed for English release by Kodansha USA.

Reception
On Takarajimasha's Kono Manga ga Sugoi! list of best manga of 2018 for female readers, the series ranked 16th, tied alongside Nireko's Sketch by Masane Kamoi.

References

External links
  
 

Josei manga
Kodansha manga